Constrained-layer damping is a mechanical engineering technique for suppression of vibration.  Typically a viscoelastic or other damping material, is sandwiched between two sheets of stiff materials that lack sufficient damping by themselves. The ending result is, any vibration made on either side of the constraining materials (the two stiffer materials on the sides) are trapped and evidently dissipated in the viscoelastic or middle layer.

References

External links 
 Passive Viscoelastic Constrained Layer Damping Application for a Small Aircraft Landing Gear System An engineering Master's thesis

Mechanical engineering